Dorsum Grabau is a wrinkle ridge at  north of Timocharis crater in Mare Imbrium on the Moon. It is 124 km long and was named after American paleontologist Amadeus William Grabau in 1976.

References

External links

LAC-40
Dorsum Grabau at The Moon Wiki

Ridges on the Moon
Mare Imbrium